Michael Duff is the name of:

 Michael Duff (physicist) (born 1949), British theoretical physicist
 Michael Duff (footballer) (born 1978), Northern Irish international footballer and manager
 Sir Michael Duff, 3rd Baronet (1907–1980), British statesman and socialite

See also
Mickey Duff (1929–2014), British boxer
Mike Duff, road racer